The Battle River Railway is a co-operative shortline freight railway created in 2010 in central Alberta. The track is 236 foot-continually welded track. It serves the communities of Alliance, Galahad, Forestburg, Heisler, Rosalind, Kelsey, providing them with a rail connection to the Canadian National line in Camrose which connects to port facilities in Vancouver and Prince Rupert, British Columbia.

Formerly, the Battle River Producer Car Group, a collective of 180 farmers, operated as a loader of grain cars only, but in May 2009, it became the Battle River Railway New Generation Co-operative, and purchased the branch line from CN in 2010.

From 2014 onward, heritage tours were introduced on the line using a Pullman car, offering themed excursions several times a year. The general manager is Matthew Enright. The founding members of the friends of the Battle River Railway are Joanne McMahon and Ken Eshpeter.

References

External links 
 
 National Film Board blob post and mini-documentary
 Alberta Venture article

Cooperatives in Canada
Alberta railways
Companies based in Alberta
Rail cooperatives
Railway companies established in 2009
Flagstaff County